"Out of the Black" is the debut single by English rock duo Royal Blood. The song was written and recorded by the duo for their debut EP of the same name, released by Black Mammoth Records on 11 November 2013. The track later appeared as the opening track on the band's self-titled debut studio album. It was also part of the soundtrack to the film Who Am I – No System Is Safe, as well as the video games Forza Horizon 2 and EA Sports UFC, and was used in a featurette for the Netflix series Daredevil at the 2015 New York Comic Con. The song served as the official theme song for the 2016 professional wrestling event WWE Roadblock. It has been covered by Billie Marten.

Music video
A music video for the song was released on 6 February 2015. It was directed by David Wilson and Christy Karacas and mixes live-action footage with animation. In the video, a robber wearing a bunny costume steals various confectionaries from a petrol station, including a chocolate bar directly from the station's attendant. When the police respond, the robber is revealed to be an alien and, along with other aliens in costumes, massacres a team of men in black who arrive on the scene. The aliens, however, are subsequently slaughtered in a fight with the attendant, who kills the alien in the bunny costume last and takes back his chocolate bar.

Critical reception
Scott Kerr of AllMusic, no relation to the band's frontman Mike Kerr, called the song "a riff-fueled onslaught that belies their two-piece status; with just a heavily processed bass guitar and a drum set between them, they make some four-piece rock bands look inconsequential". DIY editor Stephen Ackroyd repeated what Kerr said, calling the song "an incendiary calling card - a roaring, snarling Godzilla levelling skyscrapers at will".

Track listing

Personnel
Partly adapted from Out of the Black liner notes.

Royal Blood
Mike Kerr – lead vocals, bass guitar
Ben Thatcher – drums

Technical personnel
Tom Dalgety – producer, mixing (track 1), recording
John Davis – mastering
Alan Moulder – mixing (track 2)

Charts

Weekly charts

Year-end charts

Certifications

Release history

References

External links

 Royal Blood official website

2014 debut singles
Warner Records singles
2014 songs
Royal Blood (band) songs
Song recordings produced by Tom Dalgety